Kriva Bara or Kriva bara may refer to:

 Kriva Bara in Bulgaria:
 Kriva Bara, Montana Province - a village of the Brusartsi Municipality, Montana Province
 Kriva Bara, Vratsa Province - a village of the Kozloduy Municipality, Vratsa Province
 Kriva Bara in Bosnia-Herzegovina:
 Kriva Bara, Bijeljina - a populated place in Bijeljina, Republika Srpska, Bosnia and Herzegovina